Álarcos énekes is a Hungarian reality singing competition television series based on the Masked Singer franchise that originated from the South Korean version of the show King of Mask Singer. It premiered on RTL Klub on 9 February 2020.

Cast

Panelists and host

The panelists are singers Laci Gáspár and Adél Csobot; Balázs Sebestyén, taking on such a role for the first time; and Peter Dancsó, the most-subscribed YouTuber in Hungary, in his first television appearance. Bence Istenes is the host.

On 4 September, it was announced that one of the judges, Laci Gáspár had a positive coronavirus test, so he would appear only in the first two episodes of the season, being replaced by guest detectives in later episodes.

As of Season 3, the lineup of panelists changed to rapper Fluor Tomi, actor Ervin Nagy, singer Szandi, and presenter Zsófi Szabó.

Series overview

Season 1
Season 1 aired on 9 February 2020 and ended on 12 April 2020.

Episodes

Episode 1 (9 February)

Episode 2 (16 February)

Episode 3 (23 February)

Episode 4 (1 March)

Episode 5 (8 March)

Episode 6 (15 March)

Episode 7 (22 March)

Episode 8 (29 March)

Episode 9 - Semi-Finals (5 April)

Episode 10 - Finale (12 April)

Season 2
The 2nd season of the Álarcos énekes started in September 2020.

Note: On Episode 5, Claudia Liptai, had quit the competition due to testing positive for COVID-19. Péter Puskás would then become the replacement for Piggy for the remainder of the competition.

Episodes

Episode 1 (6 September)

Episode 2 (13 September)

Episode 3 (20 September)

Episode 4 (27 September)

Episode 5 (4 October) 

Note: The first version of Piggy had to quit the running in this episode due to a positive COVID-19 test and was revealed to be Claudia Liptai.

Episode 6 (11 October) 

Note: The second version of Piggy joined the running in this episode, replacing the first version that had to self-eliminate.

Episode 7 (18 October)

Episode 8 (25 October)

Episode 9 (1 November)

Episode 10 (8 November)

Episode 11 (15 November)

Episode 12 (22 November)

Episode 13 - Semi-Finals (22 November)

Episode 14 - Finale (6 December)

Season 3
The third season was announced on 12 August 2021 and premiered on 5 September 2021.

 Indicates that the masked singer was eliminated by a super card.

Note: Each panelist was given a Super Card (Szuperkartya), a one-use item that allows for a judge to try and immediately guess the identity of a celebrity behind one of the masks. If they get it right, the masked celebrity must immediately take it off and be eliminated from the competition. Ervin Nagy used his Super Card on Strawberry (Eperke) and got his guess right which caused Chameleon (Kaméleon) to join. Fluor Tomi used his Supercard on Ladybug (Katica) and got his guess right which caused Hippo (Víziló) to join. Zsofi used her Supercard on Gorilla and got her guess right which caused Automaton (Automata) to join.

Episodes

Episode 1 (5 September)

Episode 2 (12 September)

Episode 3 (19 September)

Episode 4 (26 September)

Episode 5 (3 October)

Episode 6 (10 October)

Episode 7 (17 October)

Episode 8 (24 October)

Episode 9 - Semi-Finals (31 October)

Episode 10 - Finale (1 November)

Series averages

References

2020 Hungarian television series debuts
Hungarian reality television series
Hungarian television series based on South Korean television series
Masked Singer
RTL (Hungarian TV channel) original programming